Salvation is the fifth album by German synth-pop band Alphaville and was released in 1997. Three tracks from the album were released as singles: "Wishful Thinking", "Flame", and "Soul Messiah". However, none of them charted on the German single charts. It is the last album at the Warner/metropolis label. It was also the last album with Bernhard Lloyd, who left the band in 2003.

Overview 
Salvation hit the stores in 1997 and marked a tumultuous time for the band: Ricky Echolette had left Alphaville during the production and Marian Gold and Bernhard Lloyd struggled with the way the record label did the promotion, calling it "not very good for us". The subsequent split led Alphaville to establishing their own, concert- and online-focused communication, promotion, and distribution platform.

Even though the circumstances for Salvation were not favorable, the album became a success in spite of the troubled production. This has been credited to the band returning to their synthpop-roots and heavily infusing them with dance/techno. There is a stylistic similarity between Forever Young and Salvation. An estimated 200.000 copies of the album have been sold.

Reviews 
A departure from the experimental predecessors, Prostitute and The Breathtaking Blue, the straighter, simpler style appealed to old fans and a younger audience alike.

Track listing

Personnel 
Marian Gold: vocals, keyboards
Bernhard Lloyd: keyboards, programming
Andy Richards: Keyboards, Programming
Guitars by Tim Cransfield
Electric Guitar on "New Horizons" by Elliott Randall
Percussion on "Monkey in the Moon" by Chris Hughes
String Arrangements on "Wishful Thinking" and "Flame" by Anne Dudley, recorded at Angel Recording Studios, London by Steve Price
String Arrangement on "Pandora" by John Altman, recorded at Whitfield Studios, London by Mike Ross
Leader of the Orchestra: Gavin Wright
Additional Rhythm Programs by Andy Gray-Ling, Paul Simm & Henry Jackman
Backing Vocals by Carol Kenyon & Tessa Niles
Published by BMG Ufa
Music written by Bernhard Lloyd, Marian Gold and Rick Echolette
Words by Marian Gold
Produced by Andy Richards for Sarm Productions

Charts positions

References

1997 albums
Alphaville (band) albums